Jhalmuri is a popular street snack popular in Bengali/Bihar/Odia, made of puffed rice and an assortment of spices, vegetables, chanachur and mustard oil. It is popular in Bangladesh and in the neighbouring States in India - Bihar, West Bengal and Odisha. It became popular in London when a British chef named Angus Denoon tried this snack in Kolkata and started selling it on streets of London. Popularity of Jhalmuri has also reached other western cities like New York City through the Bangladeshi diaspora.

See also 
 List of Bangladeshi dishes
 List of Indian dishes
 List of rice dishes

References 

Bangladeshi snack foods
Indian rice dishes